This is a list of notable past and present residents of the U.S. city of Anaheim, California, and its surrounding metropolitan area.

Athletics

 Khalil Ahmad (born 1996) – basketball player in the Israeli Basketball Premier League
 Kolby Allard – pro baseball player for the Atlanta Braves, born in Anaheim
 Jerime Anderson – UCLA and pro basketball player
 Barry Asher – Hall of Fame bowler, born in Anaheim
 Lonzo Ball – UCLA and Chicago Bulls basketball player, born in Anaheim
 Kezie Okpala – Stanford and Miami Heat basketball player
 Keith Beebe – professional football player, born in Anaheim
 Kevin Blankenship – Major League Baseball pitcher, born in Anaheim
 Rod Carew – Major League Baseball player and Hall of Famer
 Milorad Čavić – Serbian swimmer, 2008 Olympic Games silver medalist
 Reuben Droughns – National Football League player
 Jim Fassel – college and pro football coach, former New York Giants head coach
 Jeff Feagles – National Football League player, born in Anaheim
 Daniel Fells – National Football League player
 Jorge Flores – professional soccer player
 Hal Gregg – Major League Baseball pitcher, born in Anaheim
 Lori Harrigan – Olympic softball player
 Chris Hatcher – Major League Baseball outfielder, born in Anaheim
Joe Hawley – NFL center for the Tampa Bay Buccaneers
 D. J. Houlton – MLB player, Yomiuri Giants in Japan
 John Huarte – Notre Dame and NFL quarterback, born in Anaheim
Mike Iupati – NFL guard for the Arizona Cardinals
 Kevin Jepsen – Major League Baseball pitcher, born in Anaheim
 Tommy John – Major League Baseball pitcher
 Stanley Johnson – Los Angeles Lakers basketball player, born in Anaheim
 Joe Kelly – Major League Baseball pitcher, born in Anaheim
 Mark Langston – Major League Baseball pitcher
 Michael Lorenzen – Major League Baseball pitcher, born in Anaheim
 Chris Manderino – National Football League player
 Donnie Moore – Major League Baseball pitcher
 Bill Murphy – Major League Baseball player, born in Anaheim
 Naomi Nari Nam – figure skater
 Brian Noble – National Football League player
 Loy Petersen – NBA player for Chicago Bulls
 Elizabeth Ryan – tennis player, winner of 30 Grand Slam titles, member of International Tennis Hall of Fame, born in Anaheim
 Steve Scarsone – Major League Baseball player
 Dana Schoenfield – 1972 Olympic Games silver medalist in swimming
 Teemu Selänne – National Hockey League player
 Chris Tillman – Major League Baseball player, born in Anaheim
 Mark Trumbo – Major League Baseball player, born in Anaheim
 Josh Vitters – Major League Baseball player, born in Anaheim
 Adam Wilk – Major League Baseball pitcher, born in Anaheim
 Justin Wilson – Major League Baseball pitcher, born in Anaheim
 Tiger Woods – professional golfer, born in Cypress, attended high school in Anaheim
 Jaret Wright – Major League Baseball pitcher, born in Anaheim

Business

 Leo Fender – founder of Fender Electric Instrument Manufacturing Company
 Paul Van Doren – co-founder of Vans
 Carl and Margaret Karcher – founders of the Carl's Jr. hamburger chain
 Samuel Kraemer – rancher, oilman, and businessman
 Augie Nieto – entrepreneur and founder of the amyotrophic lateral sclerosis charity Augie's Quest

Dance 
 Lea Ved – dancer and choreographer

Literature

 Rob Liefeld – comic book writer, illustrator, and publisher
 Ren Powell (born 1966, Karen Lee Tudor in Anaheim), American-born Norwegian poet and translator

Movies, television, and media

 Angela Perez Baraquio – Miss America 2001
 Moon Bloodgood – actress
 Greg Burson – voice of Yogi Bear, Bugs Bunny, Mr. DNA in Jurassic Park, Flap and Nemo's Father in Little Nemo: Adventures in Slumberland
 Austin Butler – actor
 Rosalind Chao – actress, Star Trek: The Next Generation
 Emery Emery – film and television producer, editor of The Aristocrats
 Eden Espinosa – singer and stage actress
 Christina Haack – real estate investor and TV personality
 Presley Hart –  adult film actress
 Stephen Hillenburg – creator of SpongeBob SquarePants
 Mitchell Hurwitz – television writer and producer, creator of Arrested Development
 Mike Lockwood – professional wrestler, best known as Crash Holly
 Alli Mauzey – actress, singer
 Connie Needham – actress
 Heather O'Rourke (1975–1988) – child actress, lived in Anaheim before her acting career
 Mike Penner – grew up in Anaheim; sportswriter for Anaheim Bulletin
 Alyson Reed – dancer and actress, A Chorus Line
 Tony Revolori – actor, The Grand Budapest Hotel, Spider-Man: Homecoming Milo Ventimiglia – actor, Gilmore Girls, This Is Us Marie Wilson – actress, My Friend IrmaMusic

 Atreyu – metalcore band, formed in the city, although sometimes considered from Yorba Linda, in 1998
 Larry Beckett – poet and songwriter
Sabrina Bryan – former member of The Cheetah Girls
 Jeff Buckley – singer-songwriter and guitarist
 Tim Buckley – singer-songwriter, experimental vocalist, and musician
 Carlos Cavazo – guitarist for the heavy metal, glam metal and hard rock band Quiet Riot
 Lou Correa – politician and California state legislator
 Don Davis – film score composer, conductor, and orchestrator
 Joe DeRenzo – jazz musician
 Jim Fielder – bassist for rock group Blood, Sweat & Tears
 Bobby Hatfield – singer, one half of the musical duo the Righteous Brothers
 Crystal Lewis – singer
 Marcus Mumford – lead singer of Grammy-nominated folk band Mumford and Sons
 New Years Day – alternative metal band formed in 2005
 No Doubt – Grammy Award-winning rock group
 Phora – rapper
 J.P. Soars – blues singer, guitarist, songwriter and record producer.
 Steve Soto – punk musician and bassist for Agent Orange and The Adolescents 
 Stacey Q – synthpop and dance-pop singer, dancer, and actress
 Gwen Stefani – singer-songwriter, fashion designer, frontwoman of the rock band No Doubt
 Tairrie B – rapper and alternative metal frontwoman for Tura Satana and My Ruin
 Josh Todd – actor, singer-songwriter, frontman of the rock band Buckcherry
 Nicky Youre – singer-songwriter
 Lisa Tucker – singer and finalist on the fifth season of American Idol Jennifer Warnes – Oscar-winning singer of "I Had the Time of My Life" from Dirty Dancing''

Politics

 Delmer Berg – member of the Abraham Lincoln Brigade during the Spanish Civil War; labor union activist
 Thomas H. Kuchel – United States Senator and Republican Party whip
 Curt Pringle –  Mayor of Anaheim, Speaker of the California State Assembly
 Linda Sánchez – U.S. Congresswoman
 Loretta Sanchez – U.S. Congresswoman
 John F. Seymour – United States Senator and Mayor of Anaheim

Miscellaneous

 Joseph M. Acaba – NASA astronaut
Rosie Alfaro – convicted murderer who is on death row 
 Rudolph Boysen – horticulturist who created the boysenberry

References

 
Anaheim, California
Anaheim